Bolo is a town in and the seat of Gonjo County, eastern Tibet Autonomous Region, Western China.

Notes

External links
Location on the world map 

Township-level divisions of Tibet
Populated places in Chamdo